Jhon Arias may refer to:

 Jhon Arias (cyclist) (born 1969), Colombian cyclist
 Jhon Arias (footballer) (born 1997), Colombian footballer